As Is Now is Paul Weller's eighth studio album. Released in October 2005, it reached  4 in the UK charts.

The singles from the record were "From The Floorboards Up" (charted at No. 6), "Come On/Let's Go" (charted at No. 15), "Here's The Good News" (charted at No. 21) and the four track "The As Is Now EP" (which included "Blink And You'll Miss It") which did not qualify for the charts and was only released on 7-inch.

The CD+DVD edition includes studio footage of "From The Floorboards Up" and "Here's The Good News", the videos of "Come On/Let's Go" and "From The Floorboards Up" and the film "As Is Now". A limited edition double CD was released around the time of the 2006 Brit Awards, for which Paul was nominated. The second disc contained four tracks ("From The Floorboards Up", "Come On / Let's Go", "The Changingman", and "Town Called Malice") recorded live on 5 December 2005 at the Royal Albert Hall in London, England.

"Come On/Let's Go" appears in the soundtrack of Pro Evolution Soccer 2010.

Recording
The album was recorded over a two-week period in March 2005 at Wheeler End Studios, Buckinghamshire. It was then mixed at Studio 150, Amsterdam.

Track listing

References

2005 albums
Albums recorded at Wheeler End Studios
Paul Weller albums
Yep Roc Records albums